Yayuk Basuki and Caroline Vis were the defending champions, but Vis did not compete this year. Basuki teamed up with Tamarine Tanasugarn and lost in semifinals to tournament winners Åsa Carlsson and Iroda Tulyaganova.

Carlsson and Tulyaganova won the title by defeating Liezel Huber and Wynne Prakusya 4–6, 6–3, 6–3 in the final.

Seeds

Draw

Draw

References

External links
 Official results archive (ITF)
 Official results archive (WTA)

Doubles
Volvo Women's Open - Doubles
 in women's tennis